= Hossank =

Armenian-language daily newspaper

Hossansk
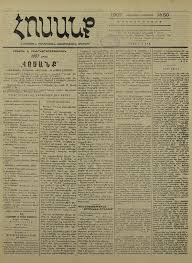
- A 1907 issue of Hossank
- Type: Daily newspaper
- Founder: Archak Zurabov
- Launched: 1906
- Ceased publication: 1907
- Language: Armenian

Hossank (Armenian: հոսանք, 'Current') was an Armenian language Menshevik daily newspaper published from Tiflis 1906–1907. Hossank was founded by Archak Zurabov. It was the sole Menshevik daily in Armenian language. the newspaper was published by Zurabov, A. Yerzinkian and K. Samuelian. 87 issues of Hossank was published.
